The 1960 SMU Mustangs football team represented Southern Methodist University (SMU) as a member of the Southwest Conference (SWC) during the 1960 NCAA University Division football season. Led by fourth-year head coach Bill Meek, the Mustangs compiled an overall record of 0–9–1 with a conference mark of 0–6–1, placing last out of eight teams in the SWC. The team went winless, with a scoreless tie against Texas A&M.

Schedule

References

SMU
SMU Mustangs football seasons
SMU Mustangs football